Venus and Anchises may refer to:

Mythology
Parents of Aeneas
Venus and Anchises, a story in Ovid's Metamorphoses

Art
Venus and Anchises, a work in the painting series The Loves of the Gods (Carracci) by Annibale Carracci
Venus and Anchise (Richmond), painting by William Blake Richmond
Venus and Anchise (Fletcher), or Britain's Ida, or Venus and Anchises, 1628 poetry attributed to Phineas Fletcher
Venus and Anchise (Haydon), painting by Benjamin Robert Haydon
Venus and Anchises, accompanied by Cupid, painting by Wallerant Vaillant
Anchises and Venus 1822 work by Jean-Baptiste Paulin Guérin
Venus and Anchise (Piranesi), drawing by Giovanni Battista Piranesi
Venus, Anchises and Cupid, painting by Thomas Rowlandson

See also
Venus (disambiguation)
Anchises